Mukunda Neupane is a Nepalese trade unionist and politician.  Presently, he is at number three in Communist Party of Nepal (Unified Socialist) after Madhav Kumar Nepal and Jhalanath Khanal. Neupane is the president of the General Federation of Nepalese Trade Unions.

Personal life 
Neupane was born in the Koshi Zone, but moved to the Terai at the age of 17.

Polical life
In 1971 he joined the militant peasants movement. In 1973 he took part in building an embryo of a trade union movement in Biratnagar. Mukunda became an underground politician activist, and stayed underground until 1990. In 1991 he was elected to parliament.

Neupane won the Bara-1 seat in the 1994 legislative election with 17953 votes. In the 1999 legislative election he got 20646 votes, but was defeated by the Nepali Congress candidate Uma Kanta Chaudhary.

Neupane was a candidate of CPN(UML) in the proportional representation list for the Constituent Assembly election.

Electoral history

1999 legislative elections

1994 legislative elections

1991 legislative elections

References

Nepalese trade unionists
Living people
Communist Party of Nepal (Unified Socialist) politicians
Nepal MPs 2017–2022
Nepal Communist Party (NCP) politicians
Nepal MPs 1994–1999
Nepal MPs 1991–1994
Communist Party of Nepal (Unified Marxist–Leninist) politicians
1950 births